Lucy Faust is an American actress. Originally from New Orleans, she performed as part of the Southern Rep theater company, before making her name in Mudbound, The Revival, Looking for Alaska, The Devil All the Time, Midnight Special and NCIS: New Orleans.

Faust is an alumnus of the Academy of the Sacred Heart and Middlebury College. She is a great-grandniece of Helen Keller, and played her teacher, Anne Sullivan, in a Bayou theatre production of The Miracle Worker in 2015.

Filmography

TV Series

References

External links

Living people
21st-century American actresses
Actresses from New Orleans
American film actresses
American television actresses
Middlebury College alumni
1986 births